Nascia cilialis, the orange-rayed pearl, is a moth of the family Crambidae. It is found from southern and central Europe to Japan.

The wingspan is 24–27 mm. Adults are on wing from June to July.

The larvae feed on greater pond sedge (Carex riparia) and sometimes other sedges.

External links
 "63.013 BF1387 Nascia cilialis (Hübner, 1796)". UKMoths. Retrieved 3 November 2022.

Pyraustinae
Moths described in 1796
Moths of Asia
Moths of Europe
Taxa named by Jacob Hübner